Derbyshire County Cricket Club in 1966 represents the cricket season when the English club Derbyshire had been playing for ninety-five years. In the County Championship, they won eight matches to  finish ninth in their sixty-second season in the Championship. They were eliminated in round 2 of the  Gillette Cup.

1966 season

Derbyshire played 28 games in the County Championship, one match against Oxford University, and one against the touring West Indians. They won nine first class matches altogether.  Derek Morgan was in his second season  as captain. John Harvey was top scorer and Harold Rhodes took most wickets.

Peter Gibbs joined the side from Oxford University, and Maurice Hill joined from Nottinghamshire. Alan Ward made his debut with Derbyshire during the season. All three saw further years service with Derbyshire.

Matches

First Class

Gillette Cup

Statistics

Competition batting averages

Competition bowling averages

Wicket Keeping
Bob Taylor 
County Championship Catches 58, Stumping 2
Gillette Cup  Catches 0, Stumping 0

See also
Derbyshire County Cricket Club seasons
1966 English cricket season

References

1966 in English cricket
Derbyshire County Cricket Club seasons